Guanine nucleotide-binding protein G(I)/G(S)/G(O) subunit gamma-12 is a protein that in humans is encoded by the GNG12 gene.

References

Further reading